The women's doubles squash event of the 2011 Pan American Games was held from October 15–17 at the Squash Complex in Guadalajara.

Draw

References

Squash at the 2011 Pan American Games
Pan